AOMG is a South Korean hip-hop and R&B record label found in 2013 by singer, rapper, and songwriter Jay Park. The label currently houses 19 musicians and UFC fighter Chan Sung Jung (The Korean Zombie).

History 
Above Ordinary Music Group (AOMG) is a prominent Korean hip-hop and R&B record label originating from the "Art of Movement," a Seattle-based B-Boying group which Jay Park joined in 2003, featuring members such as Dial Tone, Junior, and Cha Cha Malone.
Jay Park founded AOMG in late September 2013, and initially signed composer Jun Goon, singer and producer Gray, and Seattle affiliate Cha Cha Malone, who was a producer and dancer with Jay Park's dance crew Art of Movement. The label had its launch party on October 10, 2013, at "The A" in Seoul with Ben Baller as the host. The same month, the label released its first album, Gray's mini-album, Call Me Gray.

Artists Elo, Loco, Ugly Duck, DJ Wegun, DJ Pumkin, and Hoody joined AOMG over the next two years.

In March 2014, Simon Dominic announced that he had joined AOMG as co-CEO several months after his departure from his former label Amoeba Culture.

In January 2016, South Korean media company CJ E&M announced that it had formed a strategic partnership with AOMG. CJ E&M said in a statement that it would "support" AOMG with distribution and marketing, while AOMG would continue to control its music.

On October 30, 2017, rapper Woo Won-jae signed to the label.

On May 9, 2018, UFC fighter Jung Chan-sung (The Korean Zombie) signed to the label. On June 11, 2018, record producer Code Kunst signed to the label and released the single "Rain Bird". On July 25, 2018, Simon Dominic announced his resignation as co-CEO of AOMG with his song "Me No Jay Park".

In August 2019, AOMG's first hip-hop audition show Signhere began airing on MBN, marking the first ever hip-hop and R&B record label to have their own audition program on broadcast television. Singer-songwriter Sogumm won the show and subsequently signed to AOMG on November 1. On November 6, 2019, rapper Punchnello signed to the label.

On April 8, 2020, singer-songwriter DeVita signed to the label and released her debut EP Creme. On July 24, 2020, singer Lee Hi signed to the label after her departure from YG Entertainment and released the single "Holo". On September 4, 2020, record producer Goosebumps signed to the label and released the single "Somewhere" featuring labelmates Gray, Hoody, Elo, and DeVita.

On February 18, 2021, AOMG signed singer Yugyeom, a member of South Korean boy group Got7, following his departure from JYP Entertainment in January 2021. His "Franchise" dance video was uploaded to the label's YouTube channel on the same day. On December 31, 2021, Jay Park announced his resignation as the Co-CEO of AOMG.

On January 25, 2022, rapper Coogie signed to the label and released the single "Re:Up". On October 24, 2022, rapper Jvcki Wai signed to the label and released the single "Go Back".

On February 14, 2023, Sogumm departed from the label as her contract expired.

Key people 

Jay Park - Founder, Advisor - Co-CEO (2014–2021)
DJ Pumkin - CEO (2018– present)
Simon Dominic - Co-CEO (2014–2018)

Artists

Current artists
Cha Cha Malone
Gray
Loco
Simon Dominic
Elo
Ugly Duck
Hoody
Woo Won-jae
Code Kunst
Junior Chef
Punchnello
DeVita
Lee Hi
GooseBumps
Yugyeom
DJ 
DJ Wegun
Chan Sung Jung (The Korean Zombie)
Coogie
Jvcki Wai

Former artists
Jay Park (2013–21)
Sogumm (2019–23)

Discography

Philanthropy 
In December 2018, AOMG announced that the profits made from "119 Remix" would be donated to organizations related to firefighting and fire accidents. In September 2019, Gray donated the song revenue (25 million won) to Seoul Metropolitan Fire & Disaster Headquarters on behalf of the artists who participated in the song.

In August 2020, AOMG donated the revenue of their online concert (around 12 million won) to Community Chest of Korea to support those affected by the COVID-19 pandemic.

Tours 
AOMG 2014 United States Tour

Follow The Movement Tour 2016

Follow The Movement Tour 2017

Above Ordinary USA & Canada Tour 2019

Above Ordinary USA Tour 2022

Follow The Movement Tour 2023

Awards and nominations

Notes

References

External links

South Korean hip hop record labels
Talent agencies of South Korea
Labels distributed by Kakao M
Labels distributed by CJ E&M Music and Live
CJ E&M Music and Live subsidiaries
CJ E&M Music Performance Division